Donald Francis Michael Hastings (born April 1, 1934) is a longtime American actor, singer, and writer best known for his 50-year role as Dr. Robert "Bob" Hughes on the CBS soap opera As the World Turns. Hastings was the third actor to portray Hughes and is the longest serving living cast member of an American television soap opera, after the death of matriarch Helen Wagner of the same series.

Hastings was active in show business from 1940 and on television from 1947, primarily on soap operas. A rare exception was his appearance as Dave Carter in the 1958 episode "The Savage Payoff" of Beverly Garland's groundbreaking crime drama, Decoy.

Career
Born on April 1, 1934, in the Brooklyn borough of New York City, he lived his earliest years in the Bedford-Stuyvesant district. He started working in radio at the age of six, as a member of the "Bus Bunny" chorus on the serial Coast to Coast on a Bus. From 1944 to 1948, he acted in four Broadway plays. From 1949 to 1955, Hastings played Captain Video's teenaged companion, the Video Ranger, on the DuMont television series, Captain Video and His Video Rangers. He portrayed one of television's first superheroes designed to appeal to children.

Hastings was cast from 1956 to 1960 as Jack Lane on the CBS soap opera, The Edge of Night. He played Bob Hughes on As the World Turns from October 1960 until the show's final airing on September 17, 2010, and spoke the series' final line: "Good Night."

Hastings previously held the record as the longest continuous actor in the history of television serials until November 2010, shortly after As the World Turns ended. Guinness World Records stated that the non-continuous record was held by Hastings' costar Helen Wagner, who played Nancy Hughes on As the World Turns, from April 2, 1956 until her death in May 2010. Wagner departed the cast of the program, or had only appeared on a recurring basis, between 1981 and 1985.

Hastings is also a screenwriter, and wrote dialogue for both As the World Turns and Guiding Light under the name J. J. Matthews.

Personal life
Hastings and his first wife, Nan, had three children, Jennifer, Julie, and Matthew. Hastings lives in upstate New York with his second wife, actress Leslie Denniston, whom he married in 1980 and with whom he has a daughter, Kate. His son Matthew has been active in show business since 1999 as a writer, director, and producer. 

Hastings is the younger brother of actor Bob Hastings, who died in June 2014.

References

External links

 

1934 births
Living people
American male child actors
American male radio actors
American male soap opera actors
American male stage actors
American male screenwriters
American male singers
Male actors from New York City
Musicians from Brooklyn
Screenwriters from New York (state)